
Gmina Fredropol is a rural gmina (administrative district) in Przemyśl County, Subcarpathian Voivodeship, in south-eastern Poland, on the border with Ukraine.

The gmina contains part of the protected area called Pogórze Przemyskie Landscape Park.

Villages
Gmina Fredropol contains the villages and settlements of Aksmanice, Borysławka, Darowice, Fredropol, Gruszowa, Huwniki, Kalwaria Pacławska, Kłokowice, Kniażyce, Koniusza, Koniuszki, Kopysno, Kormanice, Kupiatycze, Leszczyny, Makowa, Młodowice, Nowe Sady, Nowosiółki Dydyńskie, Pacław, Paportno, Posada Rybotycka, Rybotycze, Sierakośce, Sólca and Sopotnik.

Neighbouring gminas
Gmina Fredropol is bordered by the gminas of Bircza, Krasiczyn, Przemyśl and Ustrzyki Dolne. It also borders Ukraine.

References

 Polish official population figures 2006

Fredropol
Przemyśl County